The 1956 Challenge Desgrange-Colombo was the ninth edition of the Challenge Desgrange-Colombo. It included eleven races: all the races form the 1955 edition were retained with no additions. Fred De Bruyne won the first of his three individual championships while Belgium retained the nations championship.

Races

Final standings

Riders

Nations

References

 
Challenge Desgrange-Colombo
Challenge Desgrange-Colombo